Bligh John Madris (born February 29, 1996) is an American professional baseball outfielder for the Houston Astros of Major League Baseball (MLB). He made his MLB debut in 2022 with the Pittsburgh Pirates.

Amateur career
Madris attended Foothill High School in Henderson, Nevada, and played college baseball at Colorado Mesa University. He was selected by the Pittsburgh Pirates in the ninth round of the 2017 Major League Baseball draft.

Professional career

Pittsburgh Pirates
Madris made his professional debut with the West Virginia Black Bears, batting .270 with five home runs and 31 RBIs over 56 games. He spent the 2018 season with the Bradenton Marauders with whom he hit .238 with nine home runs and 53 RBIs over 103 games, and he spent 2019 with the Altoona Curve, batting .260 with eight home runs and 55 RBIs over 132 games. After not playing a game in 2020 due to the cancellation of the season, he returned to Altoona to begin the 2021 season before being promoted to the Indianapolis Indians in May. Over 114 games, he slashed .267/.353/.417 with nine home runs and 56 RBIs and was named Rookie of the Year by the Indians. After the season, he played in the Puerto Rico Baseball League for the Gigantes de Carolina. He returned to the Indians to open the 2022 season.

On June 19, 2022, the Pirates announced that Madris would have his contract selected and that he would be promoted to the major leagues the next day. He made his MLB debut the next day as the starting right fielder at PNC Park versus the Chicago Cubs and recorded his first major league hit, a two-RBI single, in his first at-bat versus Caleb Kilian. Madris became the first Pirates rookie since Jason Kendall in 1996 to record three hits in his major league debut. As the Pirates continued their series against the Cubs on June 21, Madris hit his first major league home run while facing Mark Leiter Jr. On September 13, Madris was designated for assignment.

Tampa Bay Rays
On September 16, Madris was claimed by the Tampa Bay Rays. On November 15, he was designated for assignment.

Detroit Tigers
On November 18, 2022, Madris was claimed off waivers by the Detroit Tigers. He was designated for assignment on December 21, 2022.

Houston Astros
On January 3, 2023, Madris was traded to the Houston Astros in exchange for cash considerations.

Personal life
Madris is of Palauan descent. After making his MLB debut, he became the first Palauan to play in the major leagues.

References

External links

1996 births
Living people
Baseball players from Nevada
Sportspeople from Las Vegas
Major League Baseball outfielders
Pittsburgh Pirates players
Colorado Mesa Mavericks baseball players
Gigantes de Carolina players
West Virginia Black Bears players
Bradenton Marauders players
Altoona Curve players
Indianapolis Indians players
Brisbane Bandits players
American people of Palauan descent
American sportspeople of Oceanian descent
Houston Astros